is a Japanese professional sumo wrestler from Kawasaki, Kanagawa. He debuted in sumo wrestling in May 2017 and made his makuuchi debut in March 2019. His highest rank has been maegashira 3. Originally a member of Oguruma stable, he moved to Nishonoseki stable in 2022. He has one special prize and two kinboshi for defeating a yokozuna. He picked up his first make-koshi or losing-record in his entire career on Day 14 of the Aki (September) Tournament.

Early life and background
Yūta Minami participated in many sports at an early age competing in karate and basketball when attending Elementary School  before taking up judo at Junior High School. He also took up sumo at junior high and competed for the schools successful sumo team although he had little interest in the sport. He began to take sumo more seriously when attending Oka Prefectural High School for Kanagawa Prefecture, reaching the final of a national competition in which he was defeated by the Mongolian Altankhuyag Ichinnorov. After graduating high school Minami attended Nippon Sport Science University, and continued to compete with some success in national sumo competitions.

Career

Early career
In the spring of 2017 Minami entered the professional sumo world as he joined the Oguruma stable led by the former ōzeki Kotokaze. He adopted the shikona Tomokaze, combining the kanji for "friend" with the kanji for "wind" (風), the latter being often adopted by many Oguruma wrestlers including Yoshikaze and Takekaze.

He made his debut in the Nagoya tournament (basho) when he was unbeaten in seven bouts in the lowest jonokuchi to claim the championship (yūshō). He was moved up to the fifth jonidan division in September and secured a second promotion as he posted a 6-1 record. In November he made his first appearance in the fourth sandanme division and took his second yūshō as he won all seven of his regulation matches and then defeating Tsuyukusa in a play-off. Tomokaze began 2018 in the third makushita division and worked his way steadily up the ranks with four consecutive winning records (kachi-koshi) to land at makushita 4 for the September basho. He won five of his seven matches, securing his promotion to the second jūryō division with a win over Gagamaru in his final match.

On his jūryō debut, Tomokaze initially struggled and lost three of his first five matches but then reeled off nine consecutive wins to enter the final day one win ahead of the former sekiwake Kotoyūki. He defeated his more experienced rival by oshidashi to take the yūshō but his low rank of jūryō 14 meant that he was not eligible for promotion. In January Tomokaze was ranked at jūryō 4, giving him a realistic prospect of promotion with a strong kachi-koshi but his chances appeared slim when he ended the eighth day with a 3-5 record. In the second week however, he went unbeaten in seven bouts to end the basho on 10-5 secure his elevation to the top makuuchi division. His progress from his jonokuchi debut to makuuchi in eleven basho was the joint-fourth fastest in modern sumo.

Makuuchi career and injury
On his top division debut Tomokaze was ranked at maegashira 13 and recorded nine wins including victories over Toyonoshima, Takarafuji, Asanoyama and Shōhōzan. At maegashira 9 in May he made his twelfth consecutive kachi-koshi with eight wins and secured a move up to maegashira 7 for the July basho in Nagoya. In July 2019 Tomokaze was in contention for the yūshō after winning nine of his first eleven matches but lost to his old high school rival Ichinojō on day 12. On day 13 he faced the biggest challenge of his career when he was matched against yokozuna Kakuryū and in a major upset he earned his first kinboshi as he defeated the grand champion by hatakikomi. After the bout he commented: ″I'm happy, but it still doesn't feel real.″ He moved to eleven wins by beating Kotoekō but lost tamely to Terutsuyoshi on the final day to end with an 11-4 record. His achievements saw him awarded the shukun-shō or special prize for Outstanding Performance. On receiving the award he said ″It’s still like a dream, but I’m really happy to win this award. I put out some good sumo, but some bouts weren’t that good... I’m grateful for the opportunity to challenge the upper-ranked fighters but I have a long way to go. I’ll do my best to grow and catch up with them″. In September he defeated Kakuryū for the second straight tournament on Day 7 and afterwards dedicated the win to his stablemate and friend Yoshikaze, who had just announced his retirement. He picked up his first make-koshi or losing-record in his entire career on Day 14 of the Aki (September) Tournament, losing to maegashira 2 Asanoyama on that day.

Tomokaze sustained a serious injury to his right knee in losing to Kotoyūki on the second day of the November 2019 tournament in Kyushu, suffering a dislocation and ligament damage, with his stablemaster saying he could be out for up to a year. Following surgery and rehabilitation he sat out the next six tournaments (not including the cancelled May 2020 tournament). He made his comeback in the March 2021 tournament, with a 6-1 effort in jonidan, and two more winning records in May and July saw him progress to near the top of the sandanme division by September 2021, and he had reached upper makushita by January 2022. Following the closure of his stable, he moved to Nishonoseki stable in February 2022. March 2022 saw his first losing record since his return from injury. After the January 2023 tournament, it was confirmed Tomokaze was promoted back in Jūryō, hence becoming the only sekitori in Nishonoseki stable.

Fighting style
Tomokaze has shown a preference for tsuki and oshi techniques which involve pushing and thrusting rather than grasping his opponent's mawashi or belt. His most common kimarite or winning moves are hatakikomi, the slap-down and oshidashi, the push-out.

Career record

See also
Glossary of sumo terms
List of active sumo wrestlers
List of sumo tournament second division champions
List of active gold star earners
List of sumo record holders
Active special prize winners

References

External links

1994 births
Living people
Japanese sumo wrestlers
Sumo people from Kanagawa Prefecture
Nippon Sport Science University alumni